The Mattoon Giants were an Eastern Illinois League baseball team based in Mattoon, Illinois, USA, that played from 1907 to 1908. They were managed by Charles O'Day in 1907 and George Kiser in 1908.

The major league pitcher Grover Lowdermilk, who spent nine seasons at the big league level, played for them.

References

Baseball teams established in 1907
Defunct minor league baseball teams
Defunct baseball teams in Illinois
Baseball teams disestablished in 1908
Eastern Illinois League teams